Sanabria may refer to:

 Sanabria (katydid), a genus of bush crickets or katydids in the subfamily Phaneropterinae
 Sanabria (comarca), a comarca in the province of Zamora, Spain
 Puebla de Sanabria, a town in the comarca
 Sanabria Lake, a natural lake of Spain
 Sanabria Lake Natural Park
 25089 Sanabria-Rivera, a Main Belt minor planet
 Cerro Sanabria, a mountain in Bolivia

People
Sanabria is also used as a surname in Spanish speaking countries and refers to:
Antonio Sanabria (born 1996), Paraguayan footballer
Bobby Sanabria (born 1957), American musician
Edgar Sanabria (1911–1989), ex-president of Venezuela
Juan de Sanabria (1504–1549), Spanish conquistador
Juan Manuel Sanabria (born 2000), Uruguayan footballer
Mariangela Sanabria, Canadian politician
Miguel Sanabria (born 1964), Paraguayan footballer
Miguel Ángel Sanabria (1967–2006), Colombian road cyclist
Nicolas Sanabria (1889–1945), American philatelist
Ricardo Sanabria (born 1969), Paraguayan footballer
Ulises Armand Sanabria (1906–1969), American developer of mechanical televisions

Spanish-language surnames
Surnames of Spanish origin